Morteza Falahati  is an Iranian football defender who plays for Siah Jamegan in the Persian Gulf Pro League.

References

Iranian footballers
1989 births
Living people
Association football defenders
F.C. Aboomoslem players
Malavan players
Siah Jamegan players